Brac may refer to:

 Brač, an island of Croatia
 Brač (instrument), a type of tamburica, a lute-like instrument popular in South and East Europe
 Brac, Poland, a village near Drawno in Pomerania
BRAC (organisation), international development organisation based in Bangladesh

See also
 BRAC